Office of Emergency Planning may refer to:
 Office of Emergency Planning (Ireland), a civil/military body within Ireland's Department of Defence.
 Office of Civil and Defense Mobilization, an abolished office of the Executive Office of the President of the United States.